Ruslan Yuriyovych Palamar (born 9 August 1993) is a Ukrainian football midfielder who plays for FC Mynai.

Career

Chornomorets Odesa
Palamar is a product of FC Chornomorets Odessa youth sportive system and spent a time playing for FC Chornomorets Odessa in the Ukrainian Premier League Reserves as well few games for its senior team in the Premiers. His first coach was A.Baranov.

Zhemchuzhyna Odesa
In 2015, he joined a new amateur club Zhemchuzhyna Odesa.

Balkany Zorya
On 11 June 2018 Palamar signed contract witch Balkany Zorya after his previous club Zhemchuzhyna was dissolved.

References

External links
 
 

1993 births
Living people
Footballers from Odesa
Ukrainian footballers
Association football midfielders
FC Chornomorets Odesa players
FC Zhemchuzhyna Odesa players
FC Balkany Zorya players
MFC Mykolaiv players
FC Hirnyk-Sport Horishni Plavni players
FC Mynai players
Ukrainian Premier League players
Ukrainian First League players
Ukrainian Second League players